Pouzdřany is a municipality and village in Břeclav District in the South Moravian Region of the Czech Republic. It has about 800 inhabitants.

Geography
Pouzdřany lies on the left bank of the river Svratka, on the border between Dyje–Svratka Valley and Lower Morava Valley. A part of the Nové Mlýny Reservoir lies in the southern part of the municipal territory.

History

The first written mention of Pouzdřany is from 1244, when it was called Pauzrams in a deed of King Wenceslaus I. The village often changed owners. In the 13th century, it was property of Boček of Obřany, the convent in Dolní Kounice, and Jindřich of Liechtenstein. In the 14th century, the owners were lords of Lipá or Mikuláš Dítě, then the manor was split between two Liechtensteins.

From 1556 to 1575, Pouzdřany was owned by Ambrož of Ottersdorf, who gave it various rights, including right to plant vineyards. In 1581, during the rule of Friedrich of Zierotin, Poudřany was promoted to a market town by Emperor Rudolf II. In 1538 the Anabaptists settled in the town, however, they were expelled in the early 17th century. Pouzdřany suffered from the passage of troops between 1597 and 1608. It was looted and almost completely burned down during the following Austro-Turkish War in 1663.

In 1865, a school was built here. From 1928 to 1938, a school for the Czech minority existed here.

After World War I the multi-ethnic state Austria-Hungary was split up. By the Treaty of Saint-Germain-en-Laye, Pouzdřany became part of the new Czechoslovakia. Following the Munich Agreement German troops marched into the town in October 1938. From that time onward the town belonged to the Reichsgau Niederdonau until 1945. On 16 April 1945, Pouzdřany was liberated by Soviet troops. After the World War II, the municipality fell back to Czechoslovakia and the German population was expelled as a result of the Beneš decrees.

Demographics

Economy
Pouzdřany is known for viticulture. The municipality lies in the Mikulovská wine subregion.

Transport
Pouzdřany lies on the railway line from Brno to Hustopeče.

Sights
The landmark of Pouzdřany is the Church of Saint Nicholas. It was built in the late Gothic style around 1498, and in this form it has been preserved to this day. A massive Renaissance tower was added to it.

References

External links

Villages in Břeclav District